Clinton Township is the name of seven townships in the U.S. state of Indiana:

 Clinton Township, Boone County, Indiana
 Clinton Township, Cass County, Indiana
 Clinton Township, Decatur County, Indiana
 Clinton Township, Elkhart County, Indiana
 Clinton Township, LaPorte County, Indiana
 Clinton Township, Putnam County, Indiana
 Clinton Township, Vermillion County, Indiana

See also
 Clinton Township (disambiguation)

Indiana township disambiguation pages